Brandon Greene (born March 1, 1994) is a former American football offensive tackle. He played college football at Alabama.

College career
At Alabama, Greene split time between tight end and offensive line while also seeing time at defensive end throughout his college career. In 2016, Greene moved to strictly playing tight end and occasionally on the offensive line, playing in all 15 games his final season.

Professional career

Chicago Bears
Greene signed with the Chicago Bears as an undrafted free agent on August 7, 2017. He was waived on September 2, 2017 and was signed to the practice squad the next day. He was promoted to the active roster on December 23, 2017.

On September 1, 2018, Greene was waived by the Bears.

Birmingham Iron (AAF)
On November 19, 2018, Greene signed with the Birmingham Iron of the Alliance of American Football.

Carolina Panthers
After the AAF suspended football operations, Greene signed with the Carolina Panthers on April 8, 2019. He was placed on injured reserve on September 23, 2019, with a neck injury.

References

External links
Alabama Crimson Tide bio
Chicago Bears bio

1994 births
Living people
People from Clayton County, Georgia
People from Henry County, Georgia
Sportspeople from DeKalb County, Georgia
Sportspeople from the Atlanta metropolitan area
Players of American football from Georgia (U.S. state)
American football offensive tackles
Alabama Crimson Tide football players
Chicago Bears players
Birmingham Iron players
Carolina Panthers players